Robert Munro McKean (8 December 1952 – 15 March 1978) was a Scottish professional footballer, who played for St Mirren and Rangers. He appeared in one full international match for Scotland, in 1976.

Career
McKean started his career at local club Blantyre Victoria before moving to St Mirren in 1969. After five seasons in Paisley he joined Rangers for £50,000 in September 1974. He enjoyed a successful spell in Govan and won the league twice in his first two seasons. He was also part of the 1976 Scottish Cup Final winning team.

Death
McKean died on 15 March 1978 by carbon monoxide poisoning, only three days prior to the 1978 Scottish League Cup Final between Rangers and Celtic.

References

External links

1952 births
1978 deaths
Association football midfielders
Scottish footballers
Blantyre Victoria F.C. players
St Mirren F.C. players
Rangers F.C. players
Scotland international footballers
Scottish Football League players
Deaths from carbon monoxide poisoning
Accidental deaths in Scotland
Scottish Football League representative players